This article is to share the history and details of women in the French Senate.

History 

Women have been able to serve in political office in France since 1944. In 1997, only 5.9% of senators were women. In 2015, 25% of senators were women. 

In mid-1999, an amendment was added to the French Constitution mandating gender parity in electoral candidates for senators. 

General de Gualle declared in June 23, 1942 that "all men and women will elect the National Assembly". Marthe Simard and Lucie Aubrac were appointed members of the Provisional Consultative Assembly of Algiers:. From 1944-1945, 16 women sat as delegates to this assembly Lucie Aubrac, Madeleine Braun, Gilberte Brossolette, Claire Davinroy, Marie-Hélène Lefaucheux, Mathilde Gabriel-Péri, Pauline Ramart, Marthe Simard, Marie-Claude Vaillant-Couturier, and Andrée Viénot.

In 1946, 6.69% of senators were women, and the percentage decreased until only 1.4% in 1971. As a result of the law of parity, in 2021 women made up a third of the senators.

List of prominent female senators

Parliamentary group leaders

References 

Senate (France)
French women in politics
Women's rights in France